Meglenik is a small settlement northeast of Trebnje in the traditional region of Lower Carniola in Slovenia. The Municipality of Trebnje is now included in the Southeast Slovenia Statistical Region.

References

External links
Meglenik at Geopedia

Populated places in the Municipality of Trebnje